Tracy Flick Can't Win is a 2022 novel by American author Tom Perrotta. It was published by Scribner and is a sequel to the 1998 novel Election. In the audiobook of the 2022 novel, Tracy Flick is voiced by Lucy Liu. A film adaptation is in works at Paramount+ with Reese Witherspoon set to reprise her role as Tracy and Alexander Payne set to direct.

References

2022 American novels
Novels by Tom Perrotta
Charles Scribner's Sons books